Ohso Dam  is a rockfill dam located in Kumamoto Prefecture in Japan. The dam is used for irrigation. The catchment area of the dam is 26 km2. The dam impounds about 28  ha of land when full and can store 4300 thousand cubic meters of water. The construction of the dam was started on 1975 and completed in 2019.

See also
List of dams in Japan

References

Dams in Kumamoto Prefecture